The Donegal–Tyrone rivalry is a Gaelic football rivalry between Irish county teams Donegal and Tyrone, who first played each other in 1919. It is considered to be one of the biggest and most intense rivalries in Gaelic games. Donegal's home ground is MacCumhaill Park and Tyrone's home ground is Healy Park.

While Tyrone have 13 Ulster titles and Donegal are ranked in sixth position on the roll of honour, they have also enjoyed success in the All-Ireland Senior Hurling Championship, having won 5 championship titles between them to date.

Following the 2013 National Football League meeting of the teams, the then reigning All Stars Footballer of the Year, Donegal's Karl Lacey, was hit by some spit from the mouth of a Tyrone fan. Lacey was targeted as he left the pitch via the tunnel at Healy Park in Omagh. He had not been playing in the game due to a hip injury. President of the Gaelic Athletic Association Liam O'Neill condemned the action against Lacey, "I have always said that any behaviour that makes anyone feel less good about themselves or about being involved in Gaelic games is abhorrent to me. I wouldn't condone that type of behaviour and to spit at anyone is disgraceful behaviour. I really cannot understand the behaviour of anybody who insults or demeans anyone. It has no part in Gaelic games. My message to those people is 'we don't need you'. I don't want them in our organisation and I don't want them going to our games. I would appeal to them to go and leave our games to people who want to come and enjoy themselves."

All-time results

Legend

Senior

References

External links
 "'Claustrophobic' - How Donegal and Tyrone became Ulster's fiercest rivalry"
 
 

Tyrone
Tyrone county football team rivalries